Anna Yesipova (born Anna Nikolayevna Yesipova []) was a prominent Russian pianist. Her name is cited variously as Anna Esipova; Anna or Annette Essipova; Anna, Annette or Annetta Essipoff; Annette von Essipow; Anna Jessipowa.

Life 

Yesipova was one of Teodor Leszetycki's most brilliant pupils. She made her debut in Saint Petersburg in 1874 attracting rave reviews and the artistic admiration of both Pyotr Ilyich Tchaikovsky and Franz Liszt, particularly for her effortless virtuosity and singing tone. She then began concert tours which brought her in 1876 to the United States, where her playing was greatly admired. She heard the playing of Fanny Bloomfield and advised her to train under Leszetycki, whom Yesipova married in 1880 and later divorced. In the Summer of the same year she gave a number of concerts in Lisbon, where she had a very warm reception.

Yesipova was probably the first pianist to program the complete set of Frédéric Chopin's Preludes, Op. 28 in a recital, for a concert in 1876. Previously the practice was to perform excerpts only.

In 1885, Yesipova was appointed Royal Prussian Court Pianist. From 1893 to 1908, she was professor of pianoforte at the Saint Petersburg Conservatory. Among her students were Sergei Prokofiev, Leff Pouishnoff, Sergei Tarnowsky, Maria Yudina, Leonid Kreutzer, Isabelle Vengerova, Anastasia Virsaladze, Leo Ornstein, Isidor Achron, Thomas de Hartmann, and Alexander Borovsky (Borowsky) [1889–1968].

Recordings 
In the early 1900s, Yesipova made a number of piano rolls, some of which have made been available as modern recordings (including Thalberg's Fantasia on a theme from Bellini's La Sonnambula).
Anna Essipova (Welte-Mignon Piano Rolls) - Pupils of Leschetizky Vol.1

There is one extant acoustic recording of her playing, which is Benjamin Godard's Gavotte in G, made onto an Edison cylinder by Julius Block in 1898.

Notes

References 
 
 Comtesse Angèle Potocka: Theodore Leschetizky, an intimate study of the man and the musician. New York, The Century co., 1903 p. 223 f.

External links

portrait (by Jose Mora)

1914 deaths
1851 births
19th-century classical pianists
19th-century women musicians from the Russian Empire
Russian classical pianists
Russian women pianists
Piano pedagogues
Women classical pianists
Women music educators
Academic staff of Saint Petersburg Conservatory
Burials at Tikhvin Cemetery
Pupils of Theodor Leschetizky
19th-century women pianists